Frederick Ephraim Stancliffe (21 October 1885 – 13 January 1975) was an Australian rules footballer who played with Collingwood in the Victorian Football League (VFL).

Notes

External links 

Fred Stancliffe's profile at Collingwood Forever

1885 births
1975 deaths
Australian rules footballers from Victoria (Australia)
Collingwood Football Club players